Pharaxonotha is a genus of pleasing fungus beetles in the family Erotylidae. There are at least three described species in Pharaxonotha.

Species
These three species belong to the genus Pharaxonotha:
 Pharaxonotha cerradensis Skelley & Segalla, 2019
 Pharaxonotha floridana (Casey, 1890) i c g b
 Pharaxonotha kirschii Reitter, 1875 i c g b
 Pharaxonotha portophylla Franz and Skelley, 2008 i c g
Data sources: i = ITIS, c = Catalogue of Life, g = GBIF, b = Bugguide.net

References

Further reading

External links

 

Erotylidae
Articles created by Qbugbot